Crossgates Primrose Football Club are a Scottish football club based in Crossgates, near Dunfermline, Fife.

They were originally formed in 1926 but folded in 1960 with the club re-forming in 1983. Due to a lack of committee members, the club withdrew from the league in November 2015 and spent the rest of the season in abeyance. Following the establishment of a new committee in April 2016, Primrose returned to playing competitively for the 2016–17 season. The team have been managed since August 2017 by Alan Campbell.

Their home ground is Humbug Park, its unusual name deriving from a disused pit of the former Cuttlehill Colliery on which site the ground is located. The park was also home to greyhound racing between 1937 and 1953.

Crossgates' record attendance was 7,600 for a Scottish Junior Cup sixth round tie in 1952–53 against Auchinleck Talbot.

The club's best-known former players are Scotland legend Jim Baxter, who Crossgates sold to Raith Rovers for £200, and his second cousin George Kinnell.

Current squad
As of 3 February 2023

Honours 

 Alex Jack Cup: 2021–22
 Fife Junior Cup: 1947–48, 1955–56

References

External links

 
Football clubs in Scotland
Scottish Junior Football Association clubs
Association football clubs established in 1926
Association football clubs established in 1983
Football clubs in Fife
1926 establishments in Scotland
East of Scotland Football League teams